The Civil Marriage Act was approved by the House of Commons of Canada on third reading on June 28, 2005 (see Members of the 38th Canadian Parliament and same-sex marriage). It then proceeded to the Senate of Canada where it was debated. The bill was debated on second reading in the Senate from July 4 to July 6, 2005 and then sent to committee. Third reading debate occurred on July 19, 2005 concluding in a vote that passed the bill which went on to receive royal assent on July 20, 2005.

Senate

For the purposes of this table, the Speaker of the Senate, who did not vote, is counted as an absentee since the official Senate tabulation does not list him as an abstainer.

Liberals

Conservatives

Independents

Progressive Conservatives

(Although the Progressive Conservative Party of Canada has merged into the Conservative Party of Canada, these senators have refused to join the new Conservative Party and have chosen to sit in the Senate as "Progressive Conservatives".)

New Democrat

Marriage support by seat 

Same-sex marriage in Canada
2004 in LGBT history
2005 in LGBT history